Aaron Williams may refer to:

Music
Aaron Williams (composer) (1731–1776), British composer
Aaron Williams (musician) (born 1942), British musician
Aaron Williams (born 1993), American DJ better known as DJ A-Tron

Sports
Aaron Williams (basketball) (born 1971), American basketball player
Aaron Pervis Williams (born 1991), American basketball player
Aaron Williams (boxer) (born 1986), American boxer
Aaron Williams (American football) (born 1990), cornerback
Aaron Williams (footballer) (born 1993), English footballer

Other
Aaron Williams (cartoonist), American cartoonist
Aaron Williams (ventriloquist), American ventriloquist
Aaron S. Williams, former director of the Peace Corps